Paderborn Baskets 91 e.V., for sponsorship reasons named Uni Baskets Paderborn, is a basketball club based in Paderborn, Germany. The club currently plays in the ProA, the second highest basketball league in Germany.

The club reached the Basketball Bundesliga Play–offs in the 2008–09 season.
Players:Kendale Mccullum
Ryan Logan
Thomas Reuter
Martin Seiferth
Ivan Buntic
Demetrius Ward
Henning Ballhausen
Jens Großmann
Grant Benzinger
Daniel Mixich
Lavelle Felton
Piet Kahl
Jacksons Trapp

Current roster

Head coaches

  Werner Rotsaert (1992–1995)
  Ed Visscher (1995–1996)
  Pat Elzie (1996–1999)
  Werner Rotsaert (1999–2000)
  Nima Mehrdadi (2000–2001)
  Doug Spradley (2001–2009)

Players

Notable players
To appear in this section a player must have either:
- Set a club record or won an individual award as a professional player.
- Played at least one official international match for his senior national team at any time.

References

External links
German League Profile

Basketball teams established in 1969
Basketball teams in Germany
Baskets
Sport in North Rhine-Westphalia